Corchia is a village in northwest Italy. It is a frazione of the comune of Berceto in the Province of Parma, Emilia-Romagna. Set in the chestnut groves of Val Manubiola, Corchia is an example of a medieval borough of northern Italy. It is a settlement which maintains its medieval nucleus with stone houses, flag-stoned narrow lanes, and archways dating back to the 12th century.

The Church
The church is dedicated to San Martino although it is no longer used for religious purposes; it presents an unusual façade with a bell tower held up by an archway that crosses over the street. A new church, financed by immigrants to America and France has been built on the  village outskirts.

Mining
Corchia's history is linked to mining: once all hope of finding gold (actually pyrite) in the valley was lost – a hope that was spurred in the mid-16th century under the Farnese family – industrial exploitation of the copper deposits started in 1865 and lasted until 1942: mine shafts may still be seen on the slopes of Mount Maggio.

External links
 Corchia's official old website
 Corchia's Blog

Berceto
Frazioni of the Province of Parma
Cities and towns in Emilia-Romagna